What Becomes of the Children? is a 1918 American silent film directed by Walter Richard Stahl, with a scenario by Corra Beach. It stars Walter Shumway, Corra Beach, and Morgan Jones.

Cast

Notes
Shumway directed the remake of the film in 1936, under the same title.

References